Dado Coletti, real name Riccardo Broccoletti (born 27 August 1974, in Rome), is an Italian film actor, voice actor and radio and television host.

Biography 
He was enrolled in the school of Enzo Garinei, made his debut at Teatro Sistina, to continue his studies by attending mime and dubbing.

In that year he also hosted, on RaiUno, the TV program Big!. He participated on several occasions in the television marathons of Telethon in 1991, 1993 and 2006  as host. Between 1993 and 1994, he hosted One for all which also hosted the children's news program Bignews. In 1995, he hosted Astronave Terra on RaiUno and again from the same year to 1997 presented the four annual appointments of the Disneyland program.

In 1999, his first experience as a television actor was with "Death of a respectable girl", directed by Luigi Perelli. In the same year, he was one of the regular cast members of GNU where he played the role of a TV producer addicted to new technologies. From 2000 to 2001, he conducted Glu Glu, a program of RaiSat Ragazzi, and conducted some television games for Call Game of LA7. Also in 2001 he was one of the competitors of Nientepopodimenoche, where he won the award for television presenters organized by Rai, and in the same year he was also an external presenter of Scommettiamo che…?. Between 2002 and 2004, he continues his activity as external conductor for Sereno variabile on RaiDue. In 2004, he was also co-host of Estate sul 2, the summer version of L'Italia sul 2, and participated in the live broadcast of the 19th World Youth Day in the presence of Pope John Paul II.

In 2005, he returned to television with the Rai 1 program Sabato, Domenica & la TV che bene alla salute where he replaced Corrado Tedeschi and Franco Di Mare, In 2009, he was the presenter of the program Festa italiana with Caterina Balivo.

Since March 2021 he has been a radio host on Rai Isoradio.

Filmography

Cinema 
 I laureati, directed by Leonardo Pieraccioni (1995)
 Intollerance, cortometraggio, directed by Paul Fenech (1996)
 Una notte normale, cortometraggio, directed by Elisabetta Villaggio (1997)
 South Kensington, directed by Carlo Vanzina (2001)
 La mia vita a stelle e strisce, directed by Massimo Ceccherini (2003)
 La brutta copia, directed by Massimo Ceccherini (2004)

Television 
 Morte di una ragazza perbene, regia di Luigi Perelli - film TV (1999)
 7 vite, serie TV, episodio 2x02 (2009)
 Buongiorno, mamma!, directed by Giulio Manfredonia - miniserie TV, episodio 1x06 (2021)

Television

 Disney Club (Rai 1, 1991-1993, 1995-1999)
 Telethon 1991-1992 (Rai 1, 1991)
 Big! (Rai 1, 1993-1994)
 Telethon 1993-1994 (Rai 1, 1993)
 Uno per tutti (Rai 1, 1993-1994)
 Astronave Terra (Rai 1, 1995)
 Disneytime (Rai 1, 1995-1997)
 GNU (Rai 3, 1999)
 Glu Glu (RaiSat Ragazzi, 2000-2001)
 Call Game (LA7, 2000-2001)
 Nientepopodimenoche (Rai 1, 2001)
 Scommettiamo che...? (Rai 1, 2001)
 Sereno variabile (Rai 2, 2002-2004)
 Estate sul 2 (Rai 2, 2004)
 Telethon 2006 2006 (Rai 1 e Rai 2, 2006)
 Sabato, domenica & la TV che fa bene alla salute (Rai 1, 2005)
 Festa italiana (Rai 1, 2009-2010)

Radio 
 Radio host on Rai Isoradio.

Dubbing

Movies 
 Constantin Alexandrov in OSS 117: Cairo, Nest of Spies

TV series 
 Mark Proksch in What We Do in the Shadows 
 Ferry Öllinger in SOKO - Mysteries in the mountains

Video games 
 Stellaris (Max)

Awards 
 Telegatto for Disney Club Rai Uno (1992)

References

External links 

1974 births
Living people
Male actors from Rome
Italian television actors
Italian television presenters
Italian radio presenters
Italian male film actors
Italian male voice actors
Mass media people from Rome